The South Fork Eel River, a river in the northern part of the U.S. state of California, rises near Laytonville and flows about  in a northerly direction to its confluence with the Eel River near Weott. Some major tributaries of the mostly free-flowing river include Tenmile Creek, the East Branch South Fork Eel River near Benbow, and Hollow Tree Creek. The river drains  and is said to be the primary river supporting coho salmon in the state.

This list of crossings of the river proceeds from mouth to its headwaters. Thirty-five bridges are listed, including on the South Fork and on a large tributary, Tenmile Creek. (The East Branch South Fork Eel River, though larger, is by far less developed than Tenmile, so it is not listed.)

Mainstem

Tenmile Creek

General references
National Bridge Inventory

Notes

South Fork Eel River